Holdemania filiformis  is a bacterium from the genus Holdemania which has been isolated from human feces.

References

External links
Holdemania filiformis
Type strain of Holdemania filiformis at BacDive -  the Bacterial Diversity Metadatabase	

Erysipelotrichia
Bacteria described in 1997